Brochmann is a surname. Notable people with the surname include:

Bertram Dybwad Brochmann (1881–1956), Norwegian businessman, writer and politician
Georg Brochmann (1894–1952), Norwegian journalist and writer
Grete Brochmann (born 1957), Norwegian sociologist
Odd Brochmann (1909–1992), Norwegian architect and writer
Tonny Brochmann (born 1989), Danish footballer